Golferenzo is a comune (municipality) in the Province of Pavia in the Italian region Lombardy, located about  south of Milan and about  southeast of Pavia.

Golferenzo borders the following municipalities: Alta Val Tidone, Montecalvo Versiggia, Santa Maria della Versa, Volpara.

References

Cities and towns in Lombardy